The Flag of Balochistan is the flag of the Province of Balochistan within Pakistan. The Balochistan provincial flag shows stylised mountains of the barren province and the principal mode of transport — the camel, also the "provincial animal".

Other flags

Related pages
 Flag of Pakistan (Federal)
 Government of Balochistan, Pakistan
 Balochistan emblem
 List of Pakistani flags

Balochistan
Balochistan
Balochistan